The 1989 Brands Hatch Trophy was the fourth round of the 1989 World Sportscar Championship season.  It took place at Brands Hatch, Great Britain on 23 July 1989.

Official results
Class winners in bold.  Cars failing to complete 75% of winner's distance marked as Not Classified (NC).

Statistics
 Pole position – #1 Silk Cut Jaguar – 1:12.927
 Fastest lap – #61 Team Sauber Mercedes – 1:16.111
 Average speed – 178.642 km/h

References

 
 

Brands
Brands